"Personal" is a song by British pop rock band The Vamps featuring vocals from Maggie Lindemann. The song was released as a digital download on 13 October 2017 through Universal Music Group. It serves as the first single from their third studio album Night & Day, being included on the second part of it, called Day Edition.

Music video
A music video to accompany the release of "Personal" was first released onto YouTube on 20 October 2017 at a total length of three minutes and fourteen seconds. It features the lead singer (Brad Simpson) and Maggie Lindemann (his love interest) as children at Maggie's 7th birthday party

Track listing

Charts

Release history

References

2017 songs
2017 singles
The Vamps (British band) songs
Songs written by Digital Farm Animals
Songs written by Preston (singer)
Songs written by Rick Parkhouse
Songs written by George Tizzard
Songs written by Tich (singer)
Song recordings produced by Digital Farm Animals